Lowkowice may refer to the following places in Poland:
Łowkowice, Kluczbork County, Opole Voivodeship (south-west Poland)
Łowkowice, Krapkowice County, Opole Voivodeship (south-west Poland)
Łówkowice, Kuyavian-Pomeranian Voivodeship (north-central Poland)